James Stirling may refer to:

James Stirling (mathematician) (1692–1770), Scottish mathematician
Sir James Stirling, 1st Baronet (c.1740–1805), Scottish banker and lord provost of Edinburgh
Sir James Stirling (Royal Navy officer) (1791–1865), British admiral and Governor of Western Australia
James Stirling (engineer, born 1799) (1799–1876), Scottish engineer
James Hutchison Stirling (1820–1909), Scottish philosopher
James Stirling (engineer, born 1835) (1835–1917), Scottish locomotive engineer
Sir James Stirling (judge) (1836–1916), British jurist
James Stirling (botanist) (1852–1909), Australian botanist and geologist
James Stirling (1890s footballer) (fl. 1895–1896), Scottish footballer
Jimmy Stirling (1925–2006), Scottish footballer
Sir James Stirling (architect) (1926–1992), architect
Sir James Stirling of Garden (born 1930), British Army officer, chartered surveyor and Lord Lieutenant of Stirling and Falkirk
James Stirling (physicist) (1953–2018), British physicist and Provost of Imperial College London

See also 
James Sterling (disambiguation)
Stirling (disambiguation)